WFCC may refer to:

 WFCC-FM, a Cape Cod, Massachusetts radio station
 Women Film Critics Circle
 World Federation for Culture Collections
 World Forum Convention Center
 World Federation for Chess Composition